Giuseppe Giordano (born July 16, 1974, in Naples) is an Italian sport shooter. He won a bronze medal in the men's free pistol at the 2011 ISSF World Cup series in Munich, Germany, with a total score of 659.6 points, earning him a spot on the Italian team for the Olympics. Giordano is also a member of the shooting team for Centro Sportivo Esercito, and is coached and trained by Marco Masetti.

Giordano represented Italy at the 2012 Summer Olympics in London, where he competed in the men's 50 m pistol, along with his teammate and three-time Olympian Francesco Bruno. Giordano barely advanced to the final, after scoring a total of 559 targets from the qualifying rounds, and winning a shoot-off by one tenth of a point ahead of Portugal's João Costa, with a bonus of 49.6. Unfortunately, he finished only in fifth place by six points behind winner and defending Olympic champion Jin Jong-Oh of South Korea (662.0), accumulating a score of 656.0 targets (97.0 in the final).

References

External links
NBC Olympics Profile
 

1974 births
Living people
Italian male sport shooters
Olympic shooters of Italy
Shooters at the 2012 Summer Olympics
Shooters at the 2016 Summer Olympics
Sportspeople from Naples
Shooters at the 2015 European Games
European Games competitors for Italy
Shooters at the 2019 European Games
Shooters of Gruppo Sportivo Esercito
20th-century Italian people
21st-century Italian people